Genuine American Monster is an album by Raymond Watts, under the name PIG.  It was initially released in Japan in 1999, and did not see a release in the United States until 2002 October 22 on Metropolis Records. The US release adds one song originally from the Prime Evil EP, bringing the album's total running time to 71 minutes and 14 seconds.

Track listing
"Prayer Praise & Profit" (Raymond Watts) – 6:34
"Riot Religion & Righteousness" (R. Watts) – 5:36
"Salambo" (R. Watts) – 5:11
"Whore" (R. Watts) – 6:17
"Flesh Fest" (R. Watts) – 5:46
"Black Brothel" (R. Watts) – 2:30
"Disrupt Degrade & Devastate" (R. Watts, Günter Schulz) – 4:59
"F.O.M." (R. Watts) – 6:41
"A Fete Worse Than Death" (R. Watts) – 5:17
"Cry Baby" (R. Watts, Anna Wildsmith) – 3:19
"Inside" (R. Watts, Mike Watts) – 14:01
"Save Me (Locust Remix)" (R. Watts) – 4:59

Track 12 only available on US re-release.

Personnel
Raymond Watts
Steve White – guitars, extra programming
Jules Hodgson – guitars

Additional Personnel
Günter Schulz – guitars (7)
Andrew Bennett – guitars (5)
Lisa Millet – vocals
Carol Anne Reynolds – vocals
Anna Wildsmith – vocals
Mike Watts – keyboards
Rob Henry – extra programming
Andy Cooke – extra programming

References

Pig (musical project) albums
1999 albums